Jai Prakash Singh is an activist and politician from Uttar Pradesh, India. Singh is founder of mission kanshiram, a registered organisation and an ex-member and former vice president of Bahujan Samaj Party.

BSP President Mayawati sacked him from his posts of vice-president and national coordinator after he made personal comments against Congress president Rahul Gandhi and his mother Sonia Gandhi while addressing party workers.

References

Indian activists
Living people
Bahujan Samaj Party politicians from Uttar Pradesh
Year of birth missing (living people)
Place of birth missing (living people)